Tethers Unlimited, Inc. (TUI) is an American private aerospace company headquartered near Seattle, Washington, which performs research and development of new products and technologies for space, sea, and air.

Founded in 1994 by Robert P. Hoyt and Robert L. Forward, Tethers Unlimited began developing products based on space tether technologies, including concepts for removal of space debris and momentum exchange tethers for launching payloads into higher orbits. TUI has since broadened its suite of technologies to include power, propulsion, actuation, and communications systems for small satellites, robotic technologies for on-orbit fabrication and assembly, optical fiber winding and deployment, software defined radio communications, and 3D printed radiation shielding.

In 2007, in collaboration with Stanford University, the company launched the Multi-Application Survivable Tether (MAST) experiment to test the survivability of tethers in space.
In 2016 it was reported by SpaceNews and Yahoo that the company's subdivision Firmamentum signed a deal with SSL to fly its in-space manufacturing technologies on SSL's Dragonfly program which is funded by NASA's Tipping point initiative.

In December 2018 it was reported that Tethers Unlimited delivered a Refabricator to the ISS that accepts plastic material and converts it into high-quality 3D printer filament, for the mission duration of October 2018 to April 2019.

According to TUI's website, Firmamentum is currently working on building the 'Spiderfab' technology to "enable on-orbit fabrication of large spacecraft components such as antennas, solar panels, trusses, and other multifunctional structures." Through this technology a spacecraft would be able to build structures far greater than itself in orbit.

On May 6, 2020 it was announced that Amergint Technologies acquired Tethers Unlimited

See also
 Made In Space, Inc.
 Varda Space Industries
 NewSpace

References

External links 

Interview with Robert Hoyt on The Space Show (August 1, 2006).
"Tethers Unlimited" on YouTube (September 24, 2010).
Incredible Technology: Spiderlike Robots Could Build Giant Space Structures Space.com (April 6, 2015)

Aerospace companies of the United States
Robotics companies of the United States
Companies based in Bothell, Washington